Nauraushaun, which means "High Point" is a hamlet in the Town of Orangetown, Rockland County, New York, United States, located north of the state of New Jersey, along the northwestern shore of Lake Tappan; east of Chestnut Ridge; south of Pearl River and west of Blauvelt. It derives its name from a creek tributary, which was also known as Nauraushank.  For many years the area was called Orangeville. Its location is

History
Nauraushaun was the location of Atlantic Cotton Works, one of the oldest mills in the county. In the late 1800s the Nauraushaun school was the only one available to the children of Pearl River. In the 1920s, it was the location of The Cat and Dog Hospital.

Hamlets in Rockland County, New York